The Socotra sparrow (Passer insularis) is a passerine bird endemic to the islands of Socotra, Samhah, and Darsah in the Indian Ocean, off the Horn of Africa. The taxonomy of this species and its relatives is complex, with some authorities, including BirdLife International, recognising this species and the very similar Abd al-Kuri sparrow, as well as several from mainland Africa, as separate, and others lumping all these species and the probably unrelated Iago sparrow.

References

Works cited

External links 
Pictures of the Socotra sparrow
Socotra sparrow at the Internet Bird Collection

Passer
Endemic birds of Socotra
Birds described in 1881
Taxa named by Philip Sclater